4 in Love is a former Taiwanese all-female pop group. In 2000, BMG recruited four girls between the ages of 16 and 19, and named them 4 in Love. 

Ling Chia-lin (冷嘉琳), Huang Hsiao-rou (黄小柔), Yang Cheng-lin (杨丞琳), and Chang Chi-huey (张棋惠) were each given new names based on different weather types: Cloudie, Sunnie, Rainie, and Windie, respectively. The label's strategy for the group was to promote their doll-like voices, and market them as "The World's First 3D Group". 

The music video for their first lead single, "Fall in Love", was a first in the Taiwanese music industry for its use of three-dimensional computer animations. In 2001, their second and last album, Who's Afraid of Whom?, earned them a Silver Award in the Most Adored Artiste category at the Malaysian Golden Melody Awards. 

Although Rainie's appearance in the hit drama Meteor Garden raised the group's profile, 4 in Love's popularity was still questionable at best. At the group's first autograph session, only a handful of fans had showed up. Their songs, with the exception of "1001 Wishes" (一千零一個願望), were rarely successful on music charts. In 2002, the group was disbanded as investment in their label was pulled after the 1999 Jiji earthquake and the all artistes under the label were terminated from their contracts.

On 25 February 2018, the group reunited and performed at Rainie's concert as a special guest.

Discography

Albums 
 Fall In Love (November 27, 2000)
 誰怕誰 Who's Afraid of Whom? (July 19, 2001)

References

External links 
 Former official site (only available through the Internet Archive)

Mandopop musical groups
Taiwanese girl groups
Musical groups established in 2000
2000 establishments in Taiwan
Musical groups disestablished in 2002
Taiwanese musical duos
Pop music duos